Melastomastrum is a genus of flowering plants belonging to the family Melastomataceae.

Its native range is Tropical Africa to Namibia.

Species:

Melastomastrum afzelii 
Melastomastrum autranianum 
Melastomastrum capitatum 
Melastomastrum cornifolium 
Melastomastrum porteresii 
Melastomastrum segregatum 
Melastomastrum theifolium

References

Melastomataceae
Melastomataceae genera